Stephen K. Scher is an American art historian and the former chairman of the art department, Brown University. He is a leading collector of portrait medals and in 2016 announced the gift of his collection to the Frick Collection.

References

External links

Living people
American art historians
American numismatists
Yale University alumni
New York University alumni
Brown University faculty
Year of birth missing (living people)